To the Moon is a 2021 American psychological thriller film directed by Scott Friend, starring Friend, Will Brill and Madeleine Morgenweck. It was Friend's directorial debut.

Cast
 Scott Friend as Roger Lotz
 Will Brill as Dennis Lotz
 Madeleine Morgenweck as Mia Lotz

Release
The film premiered at Nightstream on 29 October 2021. It was released to Video on Demand on 20 September 2022.

Reception
Andrew Stover of Film Threat gave the film a score of 8/10 and called it "thoughtfully written and beautifully shot", as well as "singular and memorable", despite suffering from some "pacing issues".

Cassandra Clarke of Comic Book Resources called the film "thrilling to watch" and wrote that the script "really pushes its core cast to embody all the tensions that come with a relationship built on lies."

Alexandra Heller-Nicholas of the Alliance of Women Film Journalists called the film "lithe" and "powerful", and wrote that it "uses its slender production context to great effect, granting each of the three central players enormous scope to flesh out their characters."

References

External links
 
 

American psychological thriller films
2021 psychological thriller  films